Carausius morosus (the 'common', 'Indian' or 'laboratory' stick insect) is a species of Phasmatodea (phasmid) often kept as pets by schools and individuals. Culture stocks originate from a collection from Tamil Nadu, India. Like the majority of the Phasmatodea, C. morosus are nocturnal. Culture stocks are parthenogenetic females that can reproduce without mating. There are no reports of males, although in captivity, gynandromorphs (individuals with both female and male characteristics) are sometimes reared.

Description

The front legs have red patches at the base of the forelegs, and similar but yellow patches on the mid-legs. When the eggs hatch, the plug opens and dark, tiny, string-like young crawl out of the opening. The eggs are haploid.

Behaviour
When disturbed, the major defence method is feigning death, the body becoming rigid, and the legs held along the line of the body. They may also be found swaying to mimic the movement of foliage in wind.

The insects feed at night, when they are active. During the day, they rest, often with legs in line with the body, on their food plants.

Accidental introductions
Due to their inconspicuous nature, accidental introductions of C. morosus have been recorded around the world, including Great Britain, South Africa and the United States, where in some cases they have become a pest. Studies at San Diego Zoo found the introduced species on a large number of ornamental plants.

References

Lonchodidae
Insects described in 1901
Insect rearing